Speciality Restaurants Limited is an Indian restaurant company that owns multiple chains of fine and casual dining restaurants in India, Bangladesh and Tanzania. Speciality Restaurants Limited also owns and operates confectionery stores. The company has its registered office in Kolkata and head office in Mumbai with presence in twenty-five cities across three countries. Speciality Restaurants Limited is listed on BSE and NSE stock exchanges of India.

History
Speciality Restaurants Limited was started in 1992 by Anjan Chatterjee. The company's first restaurant was started in 1992 in Mumbai and was called
"Only Fish". In 1994, the company started two new brands "Oh! Calcutta" and "Mainland China" (both in Mumbai). The first outlet of Mainland China was started in Saki Naka. In 2012, the company got listed on BSE and NSE stock exchanges of India.

Restaurants and brands

Speciality Restaurants Limited owns and operates the following chains of restaurants and brands across multiple locations:
 Cafe Mezzuna: Semi-casual dining restaurant and specializes in Mediterranean, Moroccan, Spanish, French and Italian cuisines.
 Flame & Grill: Restaurant specializes in Kebabs.
 Haka: Restaurant specializes in Dim sum; a style of Cantonese cuisine.
 Hoppipola: Bar offering mostly finger food.
 Mainland China: Flagship restaurant. Restaurant offers Chinese food and has over 52 outlets.
 Mainland China Asia Kitchen: Offers cuisines from Asia, beyond Chinese.
 Mobifeast:
 Oh! Calcutta
 Sigree
 Sigree Global Grill
 Gong
 Zoodles
 Dariole
 Riyasat
 Episode One
 Hay
 Progressive Oriental House (POH)
 Sweet Bengal: Confectionery.

References 

Restaurants established in 1992
Restaurant chains in India
Companies based in Kolkata
1992 establishments in Maharashtra
Indian companies established in 1992
Companies listed on the National Stock Exchange of India
Companies listed on the Bombay Stock Exchange